Hvozd is a municipality and village in Plzeň-North District in the Plzeň Region of the Czech Republic. It has about 200 inhabitants.

Administrative parts
The village of Hodoviz is an administrative part of Hvozd.

References

Villages in Plzeň-North District